Eucalathis is a genus of brachiopods belonging to the family Chlidonophoridae.

The genus has almost cosmopolitan distribution.

Species:

Eucalathis cubensis 
Eucalathis daphneae 
Eucalathis ergastica 
Eucalathis fasciculata 
Eucalathis floridensis 
Eucalathis inflata 
Eucalathis macrorhynchus 
Eucalathis magna 
Eucalathis malgachensis 
Eucalathis methanophila 
Eucalathis murrayi 
Eucalathis rugosa 
Eucalathis trigona 
Eucalathis tuberata

References

Brachiopod genera